Events from the year 1697 in art.

Events
 December 13 – Tsar Peter the Great of Russia visits Dutch Republic official Jacob de Wilde in Amsterdam to view his art collection, "the beginning of the West European classical tradition in Russia"; a view of the meeting is engraved by Jacob's daughter Maria de Wilde.

Paintings

 Giovan Battista Caniana – The Crucifixion (Church of Santa Maria and San Giacomo, Romano di Lombardia)
 Adriaen Coorte – Still Life with Shells
 Carlo Maratta – The Baptism of Jesus
 Hyacinthe Rigaud – Portrait of Cardinal Louis Antoine de Noailles
 Hyacinthe Rigaud and Joseph Parrocel – Portrait of Louis, Grand Dauphin
 Painting of Christian V presiding over the Supreme Court of Denmark

Births
 March 30 – Jan Baptist Xavery, Flemish sculptor active in the Netherlands (died 1742)
 April 12 – Anton Pichler, Tyrolean goldsmith and artist of engraved gems (died 1779)
 June 22 – Pierre-Imbert Drevet, French portrait engraver (died 1739)
 June 25 – Peter van Bleeck, portrait painter and engraver (died 1764)
 October 28
 Giovanni Antonio Canal, better known as Canaletto, Venetian artist famous for his landscapes, or vedute, of Venice (died 1768)
 Johann Gottfried Auerbach, Austrian painter (died 1753)
 November 10 – William Hogarth, English engraver and painter credited with pioneering western sequential art (died 1764)
 date unknown
 Bernard Accama or Bernardus, Dutch historical and portrait painter, born in Friesland  (died 1756)
 Francesco Andreini, Italian painter (died 1751)
 Helena Arnell, one of the first Finnish painters and few female artists (died 1751)
 Claude François Devosge, French sculptor and architect (died 1777)
 Johann Christian Fiedler, German portrait painter (died 1765)
 Antonio Gionima, Italian painter (died 1732)
 Michele Pagano, Italian painter of landscapes or vedutista (died 1732)
 Giovanni Battista Tagliasacchi, Italian painter of historical scenes and portraits (died 1737)
 Cornelis Troost – Dutch painter from Amsterdam (died 1750)

Deaths
 April 4
 Jan de Bray, Dutch painter (born 1627)
 Andrea Carlone, Italian painter (born 1626)
 June 11 – Abraham Begeyn, Dutch painter of landscapes and cattle (born 1637)
 December 31 – Lucas Faydherbe, Dutch sculptor and architect (born 1617)
 date unknown
 Ludovico Gimignani, Italian painter, active mainly in Rome (born 1643)
 Muin Musavvir, Persian miniaturist during the Safavid period (born 1638)
 Mei Qing, Chinese landscape painter, calligrapher, and poet during the Qing Dynasty (born 1623)
 Claudine Bouzonnet-Stella, French engraver (born 1636)
 Giulio Cesare Venenti, Italian painter of landscapes and engraver (born 1609)

References

 
Years of the 17th century in art
1690s in art